Kevin Caron (born February 2, 1960, in Stratford, Connecticut) is a sculptor from Phoenix, Arizona. He has created more than 60 private and public commissioned works which are on display across the United States. Among his works are pieces on public display in Tucson, Arizona, Temple, Texas, Avondale, Arizona, Chandler, Arizona, Surprise, Arizona and Harrisburg, Pennsylvania. He was chosen as Visual Artist of the Year in the 2018 Phoenix Mayor's Arts Awards, and his public art sculpture Hands On won 17th Annual Best of the West Arts & Culture Award for 2009.

Although he began his work as an artist working in fabricated steel, Caron is also a pioneer in using 3D printing to create large scale 3D printed sculpture, using an 8-foot-tall Cerberus 3D Gigante 3D printer that he had built for him. His largest 3D-printed sculpture to date is Debutante, a more than 6-foot-tall sculpture. A 5-1/2-foot-tall sculpture, Epic Swoon, was commissioned by PricewaterhouseCoopers in Columbus, Ohio.

Life and career 
Caron was born on February 2, 1960. He moved to Arizona with his family in 1973. He served six years in the United States Navy, where he worked in machine shops, and aircraft maintenance yards. He was stationed in various ports of call including Diego Garcia and Misawa, Japan. He was honorably discharged in 1983.

He managed a car repair shop, and in between jobs, built his own vehicle. His career as a sculptor was inspired by his work on a privacy screen. When he had completed the screen, he visualized a fountain made from the same material. Caron became a full-time artist in 2006.

As he launched his art career, he also began a YouTube channel. By February 2023, the channel had 629 videos, 98,300 subscribers and 26.9 million views.

He lists M.C. Escher and Antoine Pevsner among his design inspirations.

In 2012, in addition to creating metal artworks, he began working with 3D printing and now creates sculptures as tall as 6 feet using his 8-foot-tall Cerberus 3D Gigante printer.

Awards 
 2018  Visual Artist of the Year, Phoenix Mayor's Arts Awards
 2014  Sculptor of the Year, ArtTrends magazine 
 2013  Sculptor of the Year, ArtTrends magazine
 2012  Sculptor of the Year, ArtTrends magazine
 2009  17th Annual Best of the West Arts & Culture Award, Westmarc, West Valley, Arizona
 2008  Juried member, Arizona Artists Guild, Phoenix, Arizona

Public and major commissions and installations 
 2020 Chandler, Arizona, Banner Ocotillo Medical Center: Ovation. Oxidized and powder-coated steel, 94" x 27" x 22"
 2020 Piggot, Arkansas, Mathilda & Karl Pfeiffer Museum and Study Center, Stepping Out. Oxidized steel, 78" x 5" x 18"
 2018 Tempe, Arizona, Sterling 920 Terrace Apartment Complex: Cosmography. Powder-coated steel, 109" x 70" x 70"
 2016 Surprise, Arizona, City of Surprise City Hall Complex: Top Knot. Powder-coated steel, 108" x 56" x 56"
 2015 Harrisburg, Pennsylvania, Whitaker Center for Science and the Arts: Wherever You Go, There You Are. Steel, 108" x 120" x 26"
 2014 Jupiter, Florida, Harbourside Place: Giant Street Urchin. Powder-coated steel, 60" x 75" x 75"
 2012 Chandler, Arizona, City of Chandler: The Seed. Powder-coated steel, 168" x 76" x 83" 
 2012 Tucson, Arizona, Pima Community College East Campus: Wherever You Go, There You Are. Steel, 96" x 96" x 24" 
 2009  Avondale, Arizona, City of Avondale: Hands On. Steel, powder-coated steel,  168" x 145" x 146"
 2007  Avondale, Arizona, Rancho Santa Fe Elementary School: Bronco Brand Birch. Steel, 84" x 42" x 42" 
 2007  Litchfield Park, Arizona, Litchfield Park Elementary School: Mighty Owl Oak. Steel, copper, 109" x 94" x 169"
 2007 Temple, Texas, City of Temple: Temple Falls. powder-coated steel, 48" x 27" x 32"
 2006  Tucson, Arizona, City of Tucson: Xhilaration. Steel, 92" x 41" x 68"

Reviews and commentary 
 Rhoades, Rebecca. "Journey of Imagination," Phoenix Home & Garden (January 2019), p. 102-109.
 ABC News. "The Real Rookies," ABC 20/20 (September 15, 2018), national network special. 
 Spanos, Litsa. "The Secrets of the Art World" (book), Blink Art Resource Press (2017) p. 224 – 227.
 Dishner, Jackie.  "Art Break: 3D Printing with Kevin Caron," Phoenix magazine (March 2017) p. 41.
 Richman, Gabby. "Kevin Caron: The Accidental Artist." So Scottsdale (magazine) (February 2014)
 D'Andrea, Niki. "Kevin Caron: Large Scale Sculptor," Phoenix magazine (January 2014)

External links 
 
 YouTube channel

References 

1960 births
Living people
Artists from Phoenix, Arizona
People from Stratford, Connecticut
21st-century American sculptors
21st-century American male artists
American male sculptors
Sculptors from Arizona